Ammiol is a furanochromone that can be found in Pimpinella monoica.

References 

Benzofuran ethers at the benzene ring
Furanochromones